The National Justice Council is an organ of the Brazilian Judicial System created in 2004 by a Constitutional Amendment, as a part of the Judicial Reform. The 15-member Council was established in 2004 by the 45th Amendment to the Constitution of Brazil. Among its responsibilities are ensuring that the judicial system remains autonomous, conducting disciplinary proceedings against members of the Judiciary, and compiling and publishing statistics on the Brazilian court system.  The President of the Council is the President of the Supreme Federal Court.

References

External links
  Official website

Judiciary of Brazil